Coelatura horei is a species of freshwater mussel, an aquatic bivalve mollusk in the family Unionidae, the river mussels.

This species is found in Africa, in Burundi, the Democratic Republic of the Congo, and Tanzania. Its natural habitat is freshwater lakes.

References

Unionidae
Freshwater bivalves
Molluscs described in 1880
Taxonomy articles created by Polbot